is a railway station on the Tobu Daishi Line in Adachi, Tokyo, Japan, operated by the private railway operator Tobu Railway.

Lines
Daishimae Station forms the terminus of the 1.0 km Tobu Daishi Line from Nishiarai Station.

Station layout
The station consists of a single terminating side platform serving one track.
There are no automatic ticket gates nor automatic ticket machines installed at this station. Fare collection and ticket sales are conducted at the transfer walkway at Nishiarai Station.

Platforms

Adjacent stations

History
The station opened on 20 December 1931.

Surrounding area
 Adachi Ward Office
 Sōjiji Temple (Nishiarai Daishi) 
 Oouchi Hospital

References

External links

 Daishimae Station information 

Railway stations in Tokyo
Stations of Tobu Railway
Railway stations in Japan opened in 1931
Tobu Daishi Line